Neolamprologus wauthioni is a species of cichlid endemic to Lake Tanganyika where it inhabits snail shells.  This species reaches a length of  TL. The specific name of this cichlid honours René Wauthion, a Provincial Commissioner in the Belgian Congo during the Belgian Hydrobiological Mission to Lake Tanganyika of 1946–1947, this expedition collected the type.

References

wauthioni
Taxa named by Max Poll
Fish described in 1949
Taxonomy articles created by Polbot
Endemic fauna of the Democratic Republic of the Congo